The 2017 Wexford Senior Football Championship is the 119th edition of the Wexford GAA's premier club Gaelic football tournament for senior graded teams in County Wexford, Ireland. The tournament consists of 12 teams, with the winner going on to represent Wexford in the Leinster Senior Club Football Championship. The championship starts with a group stage and then progresses to a knock out stage.

Gusserane O'Rahillys were the defending champions after they defeated Glynn–Barntown in the previous year's final.

This was Taghmon-Camross' return to the senior grade after claiming the 2016 Wexford Intermediate Football Championship title.

Horeswood were relegated to the 2018 I.F.C. after 19 years as a senior club when losing the Relegation final to Sarsfields.

Team changes 

The following teams have changed division since the 2016 championship season.

To S.F.C. 
Promoted from 2016 Wexford Intermediate Football Championship
 Taghmon–Camross – (Intermediate Champions)

From S.F.C. 
Relegated to 2017 Wexford Intermediate Football Championship
 Adamstown St Abban's

Group stage 
There are 2 groups called Group A and B. The top 4 in each group qualify for the quarter finals. The bottom finisher in each group will qualify for the Relegation Final.

Group A

Round 1

Round 2

Round 3

Round 4

Round 5

Group B

Round 1

Round 2

Round 3

Round 4

Round 5

Knock-out Stages

Relegation Final 
The bottom finisher from both groups qualify for the Relegation final. The loser will be relegated to the 2018 Intermediate Championship.

 Sarsfields 2-9, 1-8 Horeswood, Cushinstown, 15/9/2017,

Finals bracket 
The top 4 teams from each group qualify for the quarter-finals with 1st -vs- 4th and 2nd -vs- 3rd in each case.

Quarter-finals

Semi-finals

Final

Leinster Senior Club Football Championship

References 

Wexford Senior Football Championship
Wexford Senior Football Championship